The Dartmouth–Lake Sunapee area of the U.S. state of New Hampshire ranges from Bradford northwest along Interstate 89 to New Hampshire's border with Vermont at the city of Lebanon. There are two distinct regions encompassed in the Dartmouth–Lake Sunapee area. The Upper Valley region is the northwest-central area, including Lebanon, a commerce and manufacturing center, and Hanover, home of Dartmouth College, an Ivy League university. Surrounding towns are tourist and agricultural centers and bedroom communities for the main centers of activity.

The central and southeast portion of this area is Lake Sunapee and the town of Sunapee, a popular summer recreation and resort area. Many celebrities live on the shores of the lake, most notably Steven Tyler of the band Aerosmith. The "Dartmouth–Lake Sunapee" moniker is largely a convenience for visitors to the area; residents of the Upper Valley and Sunapee consider themselves to live in two separate regions of the state.

External links

Dartmouth/Lake Sunapee Region at NH Division of Travel and Tourism Development

Regions of New Hampshire
Tourism regions of New Hampshire